Ahmed Haouache (born 14 March 1960) is a Syrian footballer. He competed in the men's tournament at the 1980 Summer Olympics.

References

External links
 

1960 births
Living people
Syrian footballers
Syria international footballers
Olympic footballers of Syria
Footballers at the 1980 Summer Olympics
Place of birth missing (living people)
Association football forwards